Emma Huismans (born July 10, 1947) is an Afrikaans writer, journalist, and activist born in the Netherlands. At the age of five her family moved to South Africa where she learned Afrikaans. She was later a reporter for Crisis News. Her efforts against apartheid were complicated by her being white, Afrikaans, and lesbian. This is dealt with in her premier work Berigte van weerstand. (English translation: Reports of resistance) After that she did a few novels, but tended to do better in non-fiction. Her work is often deemed angry and frustrated with the difficulties of post-apartheid South Africa.

Bibliography 

Berigte van weerstand (1990)
Requiem op ys (1992)
Werken met werkelijkheid (1993)
Sonate vir wraak (1994)

References

External links
Postcolonial Web
Bibliography(In Dutch)
Further information(In Dutch)

1947 births
Living people
South African LGBT novelists
Afrikaans-language writers
South African non-fiction writers
South African women novelists
Lesbian writers